Balayya Sastri Layout is a neighbourhood of Visakhapatnam, Andhra Pradesh, India.

Transport
This area connected with all parts of the city.

References

Neighbourhoods in Visakhapatnam